Lilith is an opera created by American composer Deborah Drattell, with a libretto by David Steven Cohen.  It was premiered in 2001.

Synopsis
The opera imagines Eve returning to Eden following the funeral of Adam.  In the ruined paradise, she confronts Lilith, who in Jewish mythology and legends such as the medieval Alphabet of Sirach mated with Adam before Eve was created.

History
Drattell initially composed Lilith as an orchestral piece for the Denver Symphony when she was the organization’s artist-in-residence. It was premiered with the New York Philharmonic in 1990. 

The piece was expanded to a full-length opera, with a libretto by David Steven Cohen. Its world première was initially planned for 1997 at New York’s Dicapo Opera, but production was cancelled due to a labor dispute.  Drattell reworked the piece, presenting it as a workshop offering at the Glimmerglass Opera in Cooperstown, New York in 1998.  The full opera had its world première on November 11, 2001, at the New York City Opera with Lauren Flanigan as Eve.

References

External links
Profile of Deborah Drattell
Aufbau coverage of the opera
Brooklyn Paper coverage of the opera

English-language operas
Operas by Deborah Drattell
Operas
Cultural depictions of Adam and Eve
2001 operas
Opera world premieres at New York City Opera